Alondra Cano (born September 26, 1981) is an American politician, activist, and former member of the Minneapolis City Council from the 9th Ward.

Early life and education 
Cano was born in Cokato, Minnesota and raised in Chihuahua, Mexico before moving to Litchfield, Minnesota at the age of 10. She earned a Bachelor of Arts degree from the University of Minnesota, where she studied management, Chicano studies, popular education, and the politics of identity. She also began working as an activist.

Career 
As a college student, Cano worked with the Minnesota Immigrant Freedom Network’s board. Cano also worked with Rose Brewer, a professor and activist, to organize events against police brutality. Cano worked as a communication and public relations assistant for eleven months for Minneapolis Public Schools and worked on the staff of Councilmember Robert Lilligren. Cano ran to represent Minneapolis's 9th ward in the Minneapolis City Council in 2013 against Ty Moore to replace retiring incumbent Gary Schiff. She won and was sworn in on January 6, 2014. She is a member of the Minnesota Democratic–Farmer–Labor Party.

On December 19, 2020, Cano announced that she would not seek re-election to the city council in 2021.

References 

Minnesota Democrats
Activists from Minnesota
University of Minnesota alumni
1981 births
Living people
People from Cokato, Minnesota
Minneapolis City Council members
21st-century American politicians
21st-century American women politicians
Women city councillors in Minnesota